Boţeşti may refer to several places in Romania:

 Boțești, Argeș, a commune in Argeș County
 Boțești, Vaslui, a commune in Vaslui County
 Boţeşti, a village in Girov Commune, Neamţ County

See also
Boteşti (disambiguation)